David Bull (born 19:30pm 11 November 1951) is a Canadian ukiyo-e woodblock printer and carver who heads the Mokuhankan studio in Asakusa, Tokyo. Born in Britain, Bull moved to Canada at the age of 5. He first discovered Japanese woodblocks while working in a music shop in 1980 in Toronto, at 28, and started making his own prints without formal training.

Bull moved to Tokyo in 1986 to learn more about traditional Japanese woodblock printing. In 1989 he embarked on an ambititous ten-year project, recreating 100 images from Katsukawa Shunsho's 1775 Hyakunin isshu poetry book.

He is known for his work on the Ukiyo-e Heroes kickstarter crowd-funding project together with Jed Henry, recreating modern videogame scenes in ukiyo-e style with traditional woodblock techniques. The Mokuhankan studio has a shop and used to offer “print parties” for amateurs, where they could try the craft of printing. During the pandemic his shop temporarily shut down for 3 years, but is now back open without print parties

References

External links 
Woodblock.com David Bull's world of Woodblock Printmaking
Mokuhankan David's print shop and studio in Tokyo
Japaneseprintmaking David's twitch stream (archive on youtube)
Seseragistudio David's YouTube channel
Ukiyo-e heroes
Press Interviews and media coverage

Living people
1951 births
20th-century Canadian printmakers
British printmakers
British emigrants to Canada